Veniamin Aleksandrovich Kaverin (Вениами́н А́белевич Зи́льбер (Veniamin Abelevich Zilber); , Pskov – May 2, 1989, Moscow) was a Soviet and Russian writer, dramatist and screenwriter associated with the early 1920s movement of the Serapion Brothers.

Biography

Kaverin was born to the kapellmeister of the 96th Infantry Regiment out of Omsk, Abel Abramovich Zilber and his wife, Khana Girshevna Desson, who owned a chain of music stores. His elder sister, Leah Abelevna Zilber, married Yury Tynyanov, who was a classmate of Kaverin's older brother, Lev Zilber. 

Kaverin studied at the Pskov Governorate Gymnasium and in 1923 graduated the Leningrad Institute of Living Oriental Languages, specializing in Arabic. In 1924, he also graduated the history and philology faculty of the Leningrad State University. During that time he was close with members of OPOJAZ. Kaverin also married the younger sister of Yury Tynyanov, Lidia, and had two children, Natalia and Nikolay.

During World War II evacuation in Yaroslavl, Kaverin completed his best-known novel, The Two Captains (1938–44), which colorfully recounts the adventures of Russian polar explorers before and after the Revolution. The book, awarded the Stalin Prize in 1946, was reissued 42 times in 25 years and was adapted for the screen twice, in 1955 and 1976. 

In 1966, Kaverin published a revised version of his 1929 study of Osip Senkovsky, Baron Brambeus. Later, he worked on his reminiscences about the literary milieu of the 1920s, which contained passages highly critical of Soviet policies in literature.

As The Moscow News commented on his centenary, "Kaverin showed that even under the worst of conditions it is possible to retain one's human qualities and decency. His example is a reproach to so many other Soviet writers who sold their souls to the regime and committed reprehensible public acts".

He is buried at the Vagankovo Cemetery in Moscow.

English translations
Open Book, Lawrence & Wishart, 1955.
The Unknown Artist, Hyperion Press, 1973.
Two Captains, Raduga Publishers, 1989.
Two Captains, Fredonia Books, 2003.

See also 

 Lev Zilber
 Microbiology

References

External links 
 
 Veniamin Kaverin in the Encyclopedia of Soviet Writers

1902 births
1989 deaths
20th-century memoirists
20th-century Russian male writers
20th-century Russian novelists
20th-century Russian screenwriters
20th-century Russian short story writers
People from Pskov
Saint Petersburg State University alumni
Stalin Prize winners
Recipients of the Order of Friendship of Peoples
Recipients of the Order of Lenin
Recipients of the Order of the Red Banner of Labour
Recipients of the Order of the Red Star
20th-century pseudonymous writers
Jewish Russian writers
Russian Jews
Russian male dramatists and playwrights
Russian male novelists
Russian male short story writers
Russian male writers
Russian memoirists
Russian screenwriters
Soviet dramatists and playwrights
Soviet Jews
Soviet male writers
Soviet memoirists
Soviet novelists
Soviet screenwriters
Soviet short story writers
Burials at Vagankovo Cemetery